Jigsaw Man may refer to:
"The Jigsaw Man", a 1967 short story by Larry Niven
The Jigsaw Man, a 1976 novel by Dorothea Bennett
The Jigsaw Man (film), a 1983 espionage film based on the novel
How the victim of the 2009 murder of Jeffrey Howe was initially referred to in the press